Carl Heinrich Hermann (17 June 1898 – 12 September 1961), or Carl Hermann , was a German physicist and crystallographer known for his research in crystallographic symmetry, nomenclature, and mathematical crystallography in N-dimensional spaces. Hermann was a pioneer in crystallographic databases and, along with Paul Peter Ewald, published the first volume of the influential Strukturbericht (Structure Report) in 1931.

Education and career 
Hermann was born in the north German port town of Wesermünde to parents both of long-time ministerial families. He studied mathematics and physics at the University of Göttingen, where he received his doctorate in 1923, as a pupil of Max Born and a fellow student with Werner Heisenberg. Upon graduation, he moved to Berlin-Dahlem to work under Herman Francis Mark at the Kaiser Wilhelm Institute for Fiber Chemistry (now Fritz Haber Institute of the Max Planck Society). Later in 1925, he joined Paul P. Ewald at the University of Stuttgart, where he achieved his habilitation in 1931 with the thesis title Die Symmetriegruppen der amorphen und mesomorphen Phasen. Along with Ewald in Stuttgart, he nurtured the growing field of crystallography, especially the study of space groups, and began what was later to become Structure Reports (Strukturbericht), a reference series giving every known crystal structure determination. During his Stuttgart years, Hermann also developed the first description of anisotropic properties of materials from a crystallographic perspective.

When the Nazi Party rose to power, he objected to its political restrictions on academic positions, leaving to take a position as a physicist with the industrial dye firm I.G. Farben at Ludwigshafen, where he continued his crystallographic research and studied symmetry in higher-dimensional spaces. After the war, he lectured briefly at Darmstadt Polytechnic (now Darmstadt university of technology) between 1946 and 1947. Then, in 1947, he accepted a newly formed chair in crystallography at the University of Marburg, where he became director of the Crystallographic Institute and remained until his death. During his Marburg years, Hermann's research laid the foundation for N-dimensional crystallography.

Life and achievements 
The symmetry notation introduced by Hermann and Charles-Victor Mauguin, which later became an international standard notation for crystallographic groups known as the Hermann–Mauguin notation or International notation.

During World War II, he and his wife Eva Hermann-Lueddecke (1900 – 1997) helped many Jews hide and escape the Holocaust, for which he was imprisoned and sentenced to death. As he was an eminent scientist with influential friends, the sentence was never carried out. Hermann was an active Quaker and devoted much time to promoting international understanding.

In August 1994, the German Crystallographic Society (DGK) established the Carl Hermann Medal, its highest distinction, for outstanding contributions to the science of crystallography.

Bibliography

Books

Selected articles

See also 
 Hermann–Mauguin notation
 Strukturbericht designation
 Werner Fischer

External links 
IUCr Structure Reports Online
Biography at University of Marburg
Carl Hermann – his activity to save Jews' lives at the Holocaust, at Yad Vashem website

References 

1898 births
1961 deaths
People from Bremerhaven
German Quakers
20th-century German physicists
Christian Peace Conference members
German Righteous Among the Nations
Crystallographers
Academic staff of the University of Stuttgart
University of Göttingen alumni
Academic staff of the University of Marburg
Academic staff of Technische Universität Darmstadt